Giuseppe Merisio, known as Pepi Merisio (1931 – 3 February 2021), was an Italian photographer and photojournalist.

Biography
Merisio was one of the most prestigious photographers in Italy. He gained notoriety in the 1950s for his contributions to Famiglia Cristiana, Stern, and Paris Match. He officially became a professional photographer in 1962 when he began collaborating with Epoca and worked with Pope Paul VI in the segment Una giornata col Papa.

In 1979, Merisio compiled a black and white photoshoot, which was then held at the Polaroid Collection in Boston. In 1989, alongside Gianni Berengo Gardin, he represented Italy at the 75th anniversary of the Leica.

Pepi Merisio died in Bergamo on 3 February 2021 at the age of 90, a few days after his birthday.

References

1931 births
2021 deaths
Italian photographers